The 48th Edition Vuelta a España (Tour of Spain), a long-distance bicycle stage race and one of the three grand tours, was held from 26 April to 15 May 1993.

Race preview and favorites

Tony Rominger, winner of the previous edition, started the race as the big favourite for the overall win. Among the other contenders were his rivals of the previous year, Jesús Montoya (supported by his Amaya Seguros team that included such names as Melcior Mauri, Laudelino Cubino and Oliverio Rincón), and Pedro Delgado. The ONCE team with Erik Breukink as team leader and riders of the calibre of Laurent Jalabert and Johan Bruyneel were also a strong candidates. Other candidates included Italian Marco Giovannetti and Scotsman Robert Millar, although they weren't supported by strong teams.

Route

Race overview

A Swiss youngster, Alex Zülle, Breukink's ONCE teammate, who had been the revelation of the previous year's Tour de France, surprised by winning the prologue with a commanding lead of over half a minute over the rest of the contenders. He would keep the leader's jersey for the first week.

It was expected that the Swiss youngster, who had so far not shown climbing abilities, would lose the lead on the stage 5 mountain time trial to the Puerto de Navacerrada. Zülle not only kept his lead, he won the stage. Only Rominger seemed to be close to the rhythm of his young compatriot, as most of the favorites including Pedro Delgado lost over two minutes that day.

The high mountain stages started with the 11th, ending at Cerler. Rominger launched his first attack on the yellow jersey, winning the stage and taking almost a minute out of Zülle. He was now only 18 seconds down on the general classification. The rest of the favorites saw their chances slip away as they were now many minutes down. Only Cubino kept in touch, albeit at a deficit of two minutes.

After a close fought time trial in Zaragoza won by Mauri, the general classification was now solely a two-man fight. Two days later Rominger managed to distance Zülle on the climb to Valdezcaray and took the lead. Throughout most of the mountain stages on the Cordillera Cantabrica mountain range Rominger and Zülle closely marked each other, finishing together; However, on the final of those stages, Rominger hatched a plan to attack on a wet descent, taking advantage of Zülle's weak descending skills. Rominger managed to distance Zülle, which led to the inexperienced Zülle panicking, running wide at a corner and crashing, losing further time. By the end of the stage, Rominger had taken a famous solo win atop the Alto del Naranco and had taken another minute out of Zülle and his chasing ONCE team. This time gain would loom large by the end of the Vuelta.

The Vuelta's final stage was a 44 km individual time trial where Zülle was determined to take back Rominger's general classification lead of little over a minute. Rominger voiced his concern that a stomach illness he had contracted the day after the Naranco stage may cost him the overall win. In the end, Zülle took a dominant stage win but was unable to take back all the time he needed. Rominger thus took his second Vuelta with Zülle second and Cubino third.

Rominger dominated all three classifications and became only the second rider after Eddy Merckx in the 1968 Giro d'Italia and the 1969 Tour de France to achieve this in a Grand Tour.

Results

Final General Classification

References

External links
La Vuelta (Official site in Spanish, English, and French)

 
1993 in road cycling
1993
1993 in Spanish sport